Babice  is a village in Opole Voivodeship in south-western Poland (Głubczyce County, Gmina Baborów).

Villages in Głubczyce County